Crisp is an extinct town in Dade County, in the U.S. state of Missouri. The GNIS classifies it as a populated place.

A post office called Crisp was established in 1893, and remained in operation until 1957. The community was named after John Crisp, a pioneer citizen.

References

Ghost towns in Missouri
Former populated places in Dade County, Missouri